Hermann Hölter (31 January 1900 – 5 May 1989) was a German modern pentathlete and Generalleutnant during World War II. He competed at the 1928 Summer Olympics. Generalleutnant Hölter served as Chef des Generalstabs (chief of staff) of the 20th Mountain Army. After the war he was held prisoner of war at Island Farm (Special Camp 11).

Awards
 Iron Cross (1914)
 2nd Class (18 June 1918)
 Wehrmacht Long Service Award
 Clasp to the Iron Cross (1939)
 2nd Class (25 October 1939)
 Iron Cross (1939)
 1st Class (14 May 1940)
 Finnish Order of the Cross of Liberty, 2nd Class with Swords (26 September 1941)
 German Cross in Gold on 17 August 1944 as Generalmajor in the Oberkommando of the 20th Mountain Army
 Knight's Cross of the Iron Cross on 3 May 1945 as Generalleutnant and chief of staff of the 20th Mountain Army

Notes

References

Citations

Bibliography

External links
 
 
 

1900 births
1989 deaths
German male modern pentathletes
Olympic modern pentathletes of Germany
Modern pentathletes at the 1928 Summer Olympics
People from Lemgo
Sportspeople from Detmold (region)
Recipients of the Gold German Cross
Recipients of the Knight's Cross of the Iron Cross
Recipients of the clasp to the Iron Cross, 2nd class
Military personnel from North Rhine-Westphalia
Lieutenant generals of the German Army (Wehrmacht)
Recipients of the Order of the Cross of Liberty, 2nd Class
German Army personnel of World War I
German Army generals of World War II